Sverrir Þór Sverrisson (born 5 August 1977), known under his stage name Sveppi, is an Icelandic comedian, actor and writer. He started his career in the TV show 70 mínútur on Popp TV in 2001.

Early life
Sverrir grew up in Breiðholt, Reykjavík. He played handball for Íþróttafélag Reykjavíkur and appeared in a few games in the Icelandic top-tier handball league, Úrvalsdeild karla.

Filmography
Astrópía (2007) – Flóki
The Big Rescue (2009) – Sveppi
The Secret Spell (2010) – Sveppi
The Magic Wardrobe (2011) – Sveppi
The Biggest Rescue (2014) – Sveppi
Amma Hófí (2020)
Cop Secret (2021)

References

External links

Living people
1977 births
Sverrir Þór Sverrisson
Sverrir Þór Sverrisson
Sverrir Þór Sverrisson
Sverrir Þór Sverrisson
Sverrir Þór Sverrisson
Sverrir Þór Sverrisson
ÍR men's handball players
Sverrir Þór Sverrisson
Sportspeople from Reykjavík